Glenea fissicauda is a species of beetle in the family Cerambycidae. It was described by Per Olof Christopher Aurivillius in 1926. It contains the variety Glenea fissicauda var. lobata.

References

fissicauda
Beetles described in 1926